The Mobil 1 Presents Grand Prix of Mosport was the eighth round of the 2008 American Le Mans Series season. It took place at Mosport International Raceway, Ontario, Canada on August 24, 2008.

Race results
Class winners in bold.  Cars failing to complete 70% of winner's distance marked as Not Classified (NC).

† - The #71 Tafel Racing entry was penalized after the race for making repeated contact with the #45 Flying Lizard Motorsports entry.  30 seconds was added to the #71's time, losing it one position in the final standings.

Statistics
 Pole Position - #2 Audi Sport North America - 1:04.094
 Fastest Lap - #2 Audi Sport North America - 1:05.823

References

External links
 2008 Grand Prix of Mosport Race Broadcast (American Le Mans Series YouTube Channel)

Mosport
Grand Prix of Mosport
Mosport
2008 in Ontario